Preah Khan Reach Svay Rieng Football Club, formerly named Preah Khan Reach FC until May 2013, is a professional football club based in the province of Svay Rieng, Cambodia, that plays in the Cambodian Premier League, the top flight of Cambodian football. The club has won two League titles and four Hun Sen Cups.

Players

Current squad

Out on loan

Players with multiple nationalities
 Kouch Dani
 Thierry Chantha Bin
 Nick Taylor

Officials

Captains
Captain by Years

Record

Metfone C-League
 Winners (2): 2013, 2019
 Runners-up (3): 2017, 2020, 2021
Hun Sen Cup
 Winners (4): 2011, 2012, 2015, 2017
 Runners-up (3): 2008, 2016, 2019
Binh Phuoc TV Cup
 Runners-up (2): 2012, 2014

Cambodian League

Hun Sen Cup

References

External links
 Official website
 https://www.youtube.com/c/PreahKhanReachSvayRiengFCOfficial

 
Association football clubs established in 1997